Margaret Stone may refer to:

Margaret Stone (judge) (died 2021), judge of the Federal Court of Australia
Margaret Stone (swimmer) (1919-2001), Canadian freestyle swimmer
Maggie Stone, All My Children character
 Margaret Stone (EastEnders), EastEnders character

See also
Margaret Stones (1920–2018)